Gingerclown 3D is a 2013 Hungarian horror comedy film written and directed by Balázs Hatvani. The film stars Erin Hayes and Ashley Lloyd as high school students intruding in an old amusement park inhabited by monsters, with Tim Curry, Lance Henriksen, Michael Winslow, Brad Dourif and Sean Young providing the voices of the creatures that terrorize them.

Plot
In 1983, a group of high school students led by Biff run into their nerdy classmate Sam (Ashley Lloyd), whom they instantly begin to bully. In order to prove himself to Biff and also win the affection of Biff's good natured girlfriend, Jenny (Erin Hayes) he agrees to sneak into an old abandoned amusement park to prove his courage.

Tired of Biff's antics, Jenny follows Sam into the amusement park. After catching up with him and suggesting they should leave, feeling something is not right about the park. Suddenly, various attractions in the amusement park begin to light up. Their presence in the park has come to the attention of a creature known as Gingerclown (Tim Curry) who now attempts to torment and kill the duo. Trying to find a way out of the park, the two run into the other hideous creatures that live within the park (Brad Dourif, Lance Henriksen, Michael Winslow). Getting suspicious of how long Jenny and Sam have been alone together, Biff enters the park searching for them. He is soon found by Gingerclown, who eventually murders him. Jenny and Sam are separated from each other, with Sam being chased by Gingerclown and Jenny is captured by a giant spider (Sean Young), but  she manages to escape by killing her.

Although they are briefly reunited, Sam is captured by Gingerclown, while Jenny hides. Jenny is soon confronted by Gingerclown, but before he can kill her she chains him to a barrier, while Sam sneaks up behind him and strangles him to death with a chain. Morning comes and the pair, having survived the night, share a kiss.

Cast
Erin Hayes as Jenny
Ashley Lloyd as Sam
Michael Cannell-Griffiths as Biff
Tim Curry as Gingerclown (voice)
Lance Henriksen as Braineater (voice)
Michael Winslow as Stomachcrumble (voice)
Brad Dourif as Worm Creature (voice)
Sean Young as Nelly the Spiderwoman (voice)
Andrew Montesi as tea kettle (voice) website:

Production

The entire film was shot at night at the Budapest Amusement Park, except one scene, that filmed at the last day of shooting, in the morning. The monsters in the film were performed by puppeteers on set, while their voices were provided by veteran actors such as Tim Curry and Sean Young.

Release
The film was first released in cinemas in Hungary on May 9, 2013. It was released Direct-to-DVD in the United Kingdom in November, 2014 by Lions Gate. 
The company would release the film on DVD in the United States on November 11, 2014.

See also
It, which also featured Tim Curry as an evil clown

References

External links
 
 
 

2013 films
2013 horror films
2013 comedy horror films
Hungarian comedy horror films
2010s English-language films
English-language Hungarian films
Horror films about clowns
2010s monster movies
2013 comedy films